Dancing Stage is a series of music video games developed and published by Konami. It is a spin-off of Dance Dance Revolution for the European market as well as a few Japanese titles. Games were released for arcade, PlayStation, PlayStation 2 and Wii.

European releases

Dancing Stage
Dancing Stage is a music video game, developed by Konami, released in arcades on March 9, 1999. This game was released as Dance Dance Revolution in North America. It includes 13 songs: nine composed by Naoki Maeda, and four licenses. It uses the Dance Dance Revolution 2ndMix engine. In North America, the game received a PlayStation port, which omits "Butterfly" and "Make It Better (So-Real Mix)". Songs in the arcade version include:

 "AM-3P" by kTz
 "Boom Boom Dollar" by King Kong & D.Jungle Girls
 "Brilliant 2U" by Naoki
 "Brilliant 2U (Orchestra-Groove)" by Naoki
 "Butterfly" by Smile.dk
 "Have You Never Been Mellow" by The Olivia Project
 "Make It Better" by mitsu-O!
 "Make It Better (So-Real Mix)" by mitsu-O!
 "My Fire" by X-Treme
 "PARANOiA" by 180
 "Put Your Faith In Me" by UZI-LAY
 "Put Your Faith In Me (Jazzy Groove)" by UZI-LAY
 "Trip Machine" by De-Sire

180, kTz, mitsu-O! and UZI-LAY and are pen names for Naoki Maeda. Songs with "Groove" or "Mix" in the title require certain criteria to be unlocked by the player.

Dancing Stage Internet Ranking was released exclusively in Europe. It adds another three licensed covers, credited with the original artists:
 "It's Like That" (cover of Run–D.M.C. vs. Jason Nevins)
 "Last Thing On My Mind by Step Ahead (cover of Steps)
 "Uh La La La" by Party All Night (cover of Alexia)

Dancing Stage EuroMix
Dancing Stage EuroMix was released in 2000, and is based on the Dance Dance Revolution 3rdMix engine. It includes 28 tracks and can be expanded to a total of 34 tracks with Internet Ranking enabled. Contrary to 3rdMix, EuroMix does not use a PC Card. The game's console port was released for PlayStation on June 1, 2001 and contains 24 songs. It removes the Dancemania licenses and all but one song added in the Internet Ranking version, but adds five Konami Original songs.

 Bold denotes songs added in the Internet Ranking version.

Dancing Stage EuroMix 2

Dancing Stage EuroMix 2 was released in 2002, and is based on the DDRMAX2 Dance Dance Revolution 7thMix engine. It includes 68 tracks, of which 52 are new and 16 are Konami originals from EuroMix. EuroMix 2 requires a PC Card and omits the Internet Ranking feature.

In contrast to EuroMix, there is no home version of EuroMix 2. However, Dancing Stage MegaMix features a similar interface. This game features 28 songs, including 11 Konami originals from EuroMix 2 and a remix of "Let the beat hit em!"

Dancing Stage Fusion

Dancing Stage Fusion is the first arcade release to be powered by the PlayStation 2 through a Bemani Python board. Despite the improved hardware, this game has fewer songs than its predecessor. Fusion features 49 songs, of which ten were available in previous Dancing Stage arcade releases, ten are from the arcade release of Dance Dance Revolution Extreme and seven are from older Japanese arcade releases. The remaining 21 songs premiered in Fusion: six are Konami Originals that later appeared in Dancing Stage SuperNova, while 15 are licenses that do not return in later arcade releases, with the exception of "Waiting For Tonight" by P.A.T's reappearance in Dance Dance Revolution SuperNova 2 and Dance Dance Revolution X.

Dancing Stage SuperNova

Dancing Stage SuperNova used the Bemani Python 2 board.

Console exclusives
 Dancing Stage Disney Mix is a direct port of Dance Dance Revolution Disney Mix, the American equivalent of the Japanese Dancing Stage featuring Disney's Rave. It was released on September 28, 2001 for the PlayStation.
 Dancing Stage Party Edition is a port of the American Dance Dance Revolution Konamix, with the addition of 5 licensed songs and the removal of 6 Konami Original songs for a total of 51 songs. It was released on November 15, 2002.
 Dancing Stage Unleashed is the European counterpart to the North American Dance Dance Revolution Ultramix series for the Xbox console. Three games were released annually from 2004 to 2006: Unleashed, Unleashed 2 and Unleashed 3, each with exclusive songs replacing some of the Ultramix songs. No European counterpart to Ultramix 4 was released. These games cannot be played on the Xbox 360 or newer consoles.
 Dancing Stage Fever is the second European DDR game to be released for the PlayStation 2, although a port for PlayStation was also released. The PS2 edition uses a recolored DDRMAX2 engine with an aqua blue background complemented with star motifs instead of black and gray, while the PS edition uses a recolored DDR 4thMix engine. Also, the PS edition omits freeze arrows and full motion videos.

 The PlayStation 2 edition has 29 songs: 8 licenses, 16 Konami originals (of which 14 are also on Dancing Stage SuperNova for arcades) and 5 Bemani crossovers (of which 4 are also on Dancing Stage SuperNova for arcades). The PlayStation edition only features 15 of these songs: 5 licenses, 8 Konami originals and 2 Bemani crossovers.

 All licensed songs, with one exception, are exclusive to Fever. Both Fever releases include "All That She Wants", "Cool for Cats", "One Step Beyond" and "Virtuality" (by VBirds). On the PlayStation 2, these songs feature their music video, except for "Cool for Cats". The "Virtuality" music video notably shows the VBirds members dancing on flying dance pads to the rhythm of the arrows shown on screen. The PlayStation 2 version also exclusively features "Come On Eileen", "Teenage Kicks" (with its music video) and "The Boys Are Back in Town". "Wannabe" was once exclusive to both Fever releases, but it was later included on Dance Dance Revolution Party Collection.
 Dancing Stage Universe is the European counterpart to the North American Dance Dance Revolution Universe series for the Xbox 360. Dancing Stage Universe was released in 2007 in Europe and Australia, while Universe 2 was released in 2008 for Europe only. Both games feature exclusive songs, replacing some of the North American songs. No European counterpart to Dance Dance Revolution Universe 3 was released, as Konami launched a Chinese edition of Universe 3 in 2009 instead. These games cannot be played on the Xbox One or newer consoles.
 Dancing Stage SuperNova 2 was originally meant to complement the planned arcade release of the same name. The arcade version was cancelled, however, making this a console exclusive.

Japanese releases

Dancing Stage featuring True Kiss Destination

 is the first "Dancing Stage" title of the Dance Dance Revolution series released in Japan and other parts of Asia on July 27, 1999. The Dancing Stage games in Japan all deviate away from the main DDR series of games and for True Kiss Destination, it features a themed set of music by the Japanese group of the same name as well as original music from Konami's in house artists.

On December 9, 1999 Konami released the game on the Sony PlayStation. It was part of their "Dance Simulation" series of titles for the PlayStation.

This game notably includes the songs "Celebrate Nite" and "Sexy Planet", credited to aliases of Naoki Maeda, which returned in Dance Dance Revolution Solo 2000 and later Dance Dance Revolution 4thMix Plus. With the exception of DDRMAX Dance Dance Revolution 6thMix, these songs were subsequently kept in every main DDR release, including the current title, Dance Dance Revolution A20.

Dancing Stage featuring Dreams Come True

 is the second Japanese Dancing Stage video game. The gameplay is similar to Dance Dance Revolution and it has songs performed by the J-Pop group, Dreams Come True.

References

External links 

Dancing Stage SuperNOVA official website

Dancing Stage at MobyGames

1999 video games
Bemani games
Konami games
Dance video games
Music video games
PlayStation 2 games
Arcade video games
Dance Dance Revolution games
Xbox games
Konami arcade games
Video games developed in Japan